Cavolinia pachysoma is a species of gastropod in the family Cavoliniidae.

References 

Cavoliniidae
Animals described in 2002